Aonla may refer to:

Indian gooseberry (Phyllanthus emblica), a deciduous tree of the family Phyllanthaceae
Amala, Nepal
Aonla, Uttar Pradesh, a place in Uttar Pradesh, India
Aonla (Assembly constituency)
Aonla (Lok Sabha constituency)